Irvine Glacier is a glacier,  long, draining southeast between the Guettard Range and the Rare Range into the northern part of Gardner Inlet, Antarctica. It was discovered by the Ronne Antarctic Research Expedition (RARE), 1947–48, under Finn Ronne, who named it for George J. Irvine, of the Engineer Depot at Fort Belvoir, Virginia, who outlined the RARE photographic program.

See also
 List of glaciers in the Antarctic
 Glaciology

References

Glaciers of Palmer Land